The 2013 season was the Portland Thorns inaugural season in the newly created National Women's Soccer League (NWSL), the top division of women's professional soccer in the United States. The Thorns ended the 22-game regular season with a 10-6-6 record, qualifying them for the NWSL playoffs. In their semi-final game the team beat FC Kansas City 3-2 in extra time, qualifying them to play Western New York Flash in the championship. The Thorns beat the Flash 2–0, making Portland Thorns FC the NWSL champion.

Background

The league's founding was announced on November 21, 2012, with Portland as a host for one of eight teams. At that time it was announced by Portland Timbers' owner Merritt Paulson that the Timbers would own the team.

The chosen team, Portland Thorns FC, was announced on December 13, 2012, accompanied by the unveiling of its logo. Both the name and logo were intended to invoke Portland's nickname of the Rose City.

Cindy Parlow Cone was announced as the first head coach on December 19, 2012.

Club

Executive staff

Coaching staff

Roster 
In the National Women's Soccer League's (NWSL) inaugural season, the eight founding clubs filled out their rosters through numerous mechanisms. First, teams are allocated national team players from the United States, Canada, and Mexico. Next, teams go through the NWSL College Draft, a free agency period, the NWSL Supplemental Draft, and the signing of Discovery Players.

{| class="wikitable" style="text-align:left; font-size:90%; width:85%"
|-
! style="background:#00000; color:black; text-align:center;"| No.
! style="background:#00000; color:black; text-align:center;"| Name
! style="background:#00000; color:black; text-align:center;"| Nationality
! style="background:#00000; color:black; text-align:center;"| Date of Birth (Age)
! style="background:#00000; color:black; text-align:center;"| Previous Club
! style="background:#00000; color:black; text-align:center;"| Signed Via / Notes
|-
! colspan="6" style="background:#dcdcdc; text-align:center;"| Goalkeepers
|-
| 1
| Karina LeBlanc
| 
| 
|  magicJack (WPS)
| National team allocation
|-
| 23
| Adelaide Gay
| 
| 
| University of North Carolina
| Discovery player
|-
! colspan="6" style="background:#dcdcdc; text-align:center;"| Defenders
|-
| 2
| Marian Dougherty
| 
| 
|  magicJack (WPS)
| Supplemental draft  
|-
| 4
| Emilee O'Neil
| 
| 
| Stanford University
| Discovery player
|-
| 5
| Kathryn Williamson
| 
| 
| University of Florida
| NWSL College Draft
|-
| 7
| Nikki Marshall
| 
| 
| Western New York Flash
| Free agent  
|-
| 11
| Jazmyne Avant
| 
| 
| New York Fury
| Discovery player
|-
| 16
| Rachel Van Hollebeke 
| 
| 
|  Boston Breakers
| National team allocation
|-
! colspan="6" style="background:#dcdcdc; text-align:center;"| Midfielders
|-
| 3
| Elizabeth Guess
| 
| 
|  Boston Breakers
| Waivers
|-
| 6
| Meleana Shim
| 
| 
| Santa Clara University
| Discovery player
|-
| 8
| Angie Kerr
| 
| 
| Sky Blue FC
| Supplemental draft
|-
| 10
| Allie Long 
| 
| 
| New York Fury 
| Free Agent
|-
| 12
| Becky Edwards
| 
| 
| Kristianstads DFF
| Free agent
|-
| 17
| Tobin Heath
| 
| 
| Paris Saint-Germain
| National team allocation
|-
| 20
| Courtney Wetzel
| 
| 
| Oregon State University
| Discovery player
|-
| 21
| Nikki Washington
| 
| 
| Canberra United FC
| Free agent
|-
! colspan="6" style="background:#dcdcdc; text-align:center;"| Forwards
|-
| 9
| Danielle Foxhoven
| 
| 
| FC Energy Voronezh
| Discovery player  
|-
| 12
| Christine Sinclair (captain)
| 
| 
|  Western New York Flash
| National team allocation
|- 
| 13
| Alex Morgan
| 
| 
|  Seattle Sounders Women 
| National team allocation
|-
| 18
| Jessica Shufelt
| 
| 
| Ottawa Fury Women
| Supplemental draft

Competitions 
All times Pacific Daylight Time (UTC−07:00)

Preseason

Regular season

Final round

Results summary

Results by round

Statistics

Team statistics 

Statistics accurate as of October 11, 2013

Goalkeeper stats 

Last updated: October 11, 2013

Honors
NWSL Player of the Month

Player Transactions

National Team Player Allocation 
On January 11, 2013, the league held its player allocation for the national team players, with Portland receiving seven players: Rachel Buehler, Tobin Heath, Karina LeBlanc, Alex Morgan, Marlene Sandoval, Luz Saucedo, and Christine Sinclair. On January 23, 2013, Heath signed a six-month contract with Paris Saint-Germain and expected to join the Thorns FC once the French club's season is concluded. On March 21, 2013, Sandoval and Saucedo, the two allocated Mexico national team defenders, were removed from the team roster, due to an injury and decision by the Mexican Football Federation, respectively.

National Women's Soccer League College Draft 
Each team in the NWSL got to pick once per round, with the draft order based on how well each team did in allocation. The Thorns picked eighth (last) in each round.

Supplemental Draft Picks 
Any player that wasn’t selected in the NWSL College Draft, and was done with her college eligibility, was eligible for the NWSL Supplemental Draft. The draft lasted six rounds. Again, the Thorns selected eighth (last) in each round.

Transfers In

Transfers Out

References 

Portland Thorns
Portland Thorns
Portland Thorns FC seasons
Portland Thorns
Portland